Spyridium daltonii is a species of flowering plant in the family Rhamnaceae and is endemic to Victoria in Australia. It is a shrub with softly-hairy branchlets, linear to narrowly elliptic leaves, and small groups of hairy, yellowish flowers.

Description
The edges of the leaves are rolled under, the tip is sharply-pointed, the upper surface is glabrous and the lower surface is covered with star-shaped hairs.

Taxonomy
This spyridium was first formally described in 1875 by Ferdinand von Mueller who gave it the name Trymalium daltonii in Fragmenta Phytographiae Australiae from specimens collected by St. Ely D'Alton. In 2006, Jürgen Kellermann changed the name to Spyridium daltonii in the journal Muelleria.

Distribution
Spyridium daltonii grows in heathy woodland and is endemic to central areas of the Grampians in Victoria.

References

daltonii
Rosales of Australia
Flora of Victoria (Australia)
Plants described in 1875
Taxa named by Ferdinand von Mueller